Lonnie Paul Dade (December 7, 1951 – August 25, 2016) was a Major League Baseball outfielder/third baseman.  On June 4, 1970 he was drafted by the California Angels in the 1st round (10th pick) of the 1970 amateur draft.  He played for the Angels (1975–1976), Cleveland Indians (1977–1979), and San Diego Padres (1979–1980).

Dade was called up to the Angels after hitting .332 in 100 games for the El Paso Diablos of the Texas League and then .545 in 9 games for the Salt Lake City Gulls of the Pacific Coast League.  He made his major league debut on September 12, 1975 at Royals Stadium, starting the second game of a doubleheader in left field against Kansas City. He went 0-for-3 against Al Fitzmorris.

With the Cleveland Indians in 1977, Dade had career-highs for games played (134), games started (111), plate appearances (508), hits (134), batting average (.291), runs batted in (45), and runs (65).

Dade's career totals include 439 games played, a .270 batting average (355-for-1,313), 10 HR, 107 RBI, 186 runs scored, a .328 on-base percentage, and 57 stolen bases.

Dade died of cancer on August 25, 2016.

References

1976 Baseball Register published by The Sporting News

External links
, or Retrosheet, or Baseball Reference (Minor and Japanese leagues), or Pura Pelota (Venezuelan Winter League), or Dade Today (Where are they now)

1951 births
2016 deaths
African-American baseball players
American expatriate baseball players in Japan
Baseball players from Seattle
California Angels players
Cleveland Indians players
Deaths from cancer in Washington (state)
El Paso Diablos players
El Paso Sun Kings players
Hanshin Tigers players
Hawaii Islanders players
Idaho Falls Angels players
Major League Baseball outfielders
Major League Baseball third basemen
Navegantes del Magallanes players
American expatriate baseball players in Venezuela
Portland Beavers players
Quad Cities Angels players
Salt Lake City Angels players
Salt Lake City Gulls players
San Diego Padres players
Shreveport Captains players
20th-century African-American sportspeople
21st-century African-American people